Alfred Burgemeister (July 22, 1906 – April 23, 1970) was a German politician of the Christian Democratic Union (CDU) and former member of the German Bundestag.

Life 
Burgemeister joined the CDU. From 1962 to 1970 he was chairman of the district association Helmstedt and from 1968 to 1970 of the regional association Braunschweig. He was also a member of the executive board of the Lower Saxony CDU.

As a direct candidate, he was a member of the German Bundestag from 1953 to 1965 for constituency 51 (Braunschweig/Land-Helmstedt) and from 1965 to 1969 for constituency 46 (Helmstedt-Wolfsburg), as well as in 1969 via 3rd place on the Lower Saxony regional list.

From 1957 to 1963, he was chairman of the middle class discussion group of the CDU/CSU parliamentary group. In 1960/61 he was deputy chairman of the parliamentary group under Heinrich Krone. From 1963 to 1969 he was chairman of the parliamentary group's working group on economics and nutrition.

He was a full member of the Committee on Civil Service Law (1953-1957), the Committee on Food, Agriculture and Forestry (1956/57), the Committee on Pan-German and Berlin Issues (1953-1957), the Defence Committee (1969/70), the Committee on Health Care (1957-1960) and the Committee on Small and Medium-Sized Businesses (1957-1965). He was also a deputy member of the Committee on Internal Administration and Home Affairs (1955-1965), the Committee on Posts and Telecommunications (1955-1957), the Committee on Special Questions concerning Small and Medium-Sized Enterprises (1956/57), the Committee on Health Care (1960/61), the Committee on Defence (1953-1961, 1970), the Committee on War Victims and Refugees (1961-1965) and the Committee on Economic Affairs and Small and Medium-Sized Enterprises (1965-1970).

Literature

References

1906 births
1970 deaths
Members of the Bundestag for Lower Saxony
Members of the Bundestag 1969–1972
Members of the Bundestag 1965–1969
Members of the Bundestag 1961–1965
Members of the Bundestag 1957–1961
Members of the Bundestag 1953–1957
Members of the Bundestag for the Christian Democratic Union of Germany